Flight 741 may refer to:

TWA Flight 741, hijacked on 6 September 1970
EgyptAir Flight 741, crashed on 29 January 1973

it is also a book in The Executioner (book series)

0741